Quntayqucha Punta (Quechua quntay clay, gypsum or magnesia, qucha lake, punta peak, ridge, Hispanicized spelling Contaycocha Punta) is a mountain in the Wallanka mountain range in the Andes of Peru which reaches an altitude of approximately . It is located in the Ancash Region, Bolognesi Province, Huasta District, southwest of Chawpi Hanka.

References 

Mountains of Peru
Mountains of Ancash Region